Epidirella is a genus of sea snails, marine gastropod mollusks in the family Turridae, the turrids.

Species
Species within the genus Epidirella include:
 Epidirella xanthophaes (R.B. Watson, 1886)
Species brought into synonymy
 Epidirella tasmanica (May, 1911): synonym of Epidirella xanthophaes (R. B. Watson, 1886)

References

 Powell, Arthur William Baden. "The Australian Tertiary Mollusca of the Family Turridae." Records of the Auckland Institute and Museum 3.1 (1944): 3-68.
 Laseron C.F. (1954). Revision of the New South Wales Turridae. Royal Zoological Society of New South Wales Australian Zoological Handbook. Sydney: Royal Zoological Society of New South Wales. 56 pp., 12 pls.

External links
 Iredale, T. (1931). Australian molluscan notes. Nº I. Records of the Australian Museum. 18: 201-235
 To World Register of Marine Species
 
 Worldwide Mollusc Species Data Base: Turridae
 Bouchet, P.; Kantor, Y. I.; Sysoev, A.; Puillandre, N. (2011). A new operational classification of the Conoidea (Gastropoda). Journal of Molluscan Studies. 77(3): 273-308.

Monotypic gastropod genera